Ordinary Corrupt Human Love is the fourth studio album by American band Deafheaven, released on July 13, 2018 through Anti-. The title of the album was inspired by Graham Greene's 1951 novel The End of the Affair.

Release and promotion
On January 30, 2018, Deafheaven posted on social media a photo of the members recording the album in a studio, and later confirmed to Pitchfork that they were working on a new album at 25th Street Recording in Oakland, California with longtime collaborator and producer Jack Shirley. They released the lead single of the album, "Honeycomb", on April 18, 2018, and announced the album and its accompanying tour the following day. The second single, "Canary Yellow", was released on June 12. The album was made available for streaming exclusively on NPR on July 5, before being officially released on July 13 on CD, vinyl, digital download and streaming services via Anti-.

Critical reception

At Metacritic, which assigns a normalized rating out of 100 to reviews from mainstream publications, Ordinary Corrupt Human Love received an average score of 85 based on 26 reviews, indicating "universal acclaim".

Evan Lilly of The Line of Best Fit wrote, "Ordinary Corrupt Human Love is not perfect, but Deafheaven remain captivating," further stating: "While embracing their black metal roots, Deafheaven tap into their gentler and more experimental side of songwriting by creating one of this year’s richest, most cinematic metal albums." DIY critic Will Richards opined, "Deafheaven finally look comfortable in their many different skins, their opposing worlds gliding together seamlessly," and stated that the album "repositions the band as a genreless powerhouse, and solidifies their status as indie mainstream minglers." TJ Kliebhan of Consequence of Sound said the album has "moving, emotional pieces and sharp performances bolstered by a band clearly stretching out of its comfort zone successfully," continuing: "The album is a refreshing new shade of their sound without abandoning the band's core mechanics." NMEs James McMahon wrote, "Deafheaven's brilliance has long been hung upon the pursuit of a truth, like documentarians before they hit the edit suite. These songs are filthy, dank, often devoid of light, but like a weed emerging from a pavement's crack, there's something resembling hope there. A suggestion that maybe there's something more."

Accolades

Track listing

Notes
 "You Without End" features spoken words by Nadia Kury, taken from excerpts of the short story Black and Borax by Tom McElravey.
 "Night People" features additional vocals and production by Chelsea Wolfe and Ben Chisholm.

Personnel
Credits adapted from the liner notes of Ordinary Corrupt Human Love.

Deafheaven
 George Clarke – vocals, piano, keyboards
 Kerry McCoy – guitar
 Daniel Tracy – drums
 Shiv Mehra – guitar
 Chris Johnson – bass

Additional personnel
 Jack Shirley – production, engineering, mixing, mastering
 Nadia Kury – spoken words 
 Chelsea Wolfe – additional vocals, additional production 
 Ben Chisholm – additional vocals, additional production 
 Nick Steinhardt – art direction, design
 Sean Stout – photography

Charts

References

2018 albums
Deafheaven albums
Albums produced by Jack Shirley
Anti- (record label) albums